Atbaichandi is a  village in the Indpur CD block in the Khatra subdivision of the Bankura district in the state of West Bengal, India.

Geography

Location

Note: The map alongside presents some of the notable locations in the subdivision. All places marked in the map are linked in the larger full screen map.

Demographics
According to the 2011 Census of India, Atbaichandi had a total population of 1,310, of which 658 (50%) were males and 652 (50%) were females. There were 190 persons in the age range of 0–6 years. The total number of literate persons in Atbaichandi was 693 (61.88% of the population over 6 years).

Culture
David J. McCutchion says that old ruins, images and tumbled remains of old structures spread across Mallabhum, e.g. the three temples at Atbaichandi in Indpur PS, stand as evidence of extensive temple-building by the Rajas of Bishnupur. Although subject to occasional incursions, “their territory was largely beyond the sphere of Muslim influence.”

References

External links

Villages in Bankura district